La portiera nuda (The Naked Doorwoman) is a 1976 Italian commedia sexy all'italiana directed by Luigi Cozzi. It starred Irene Miracle and Erika Blanc.

Plot 
A young woman working as a concierge/maid in an apartment building is accosted by various sex-minded weirdo tenants.

Cast 
 Irene Miracle: Gianna
 Erika Blanc: Annie Petré 
 Giorgio Bracardi: Dr. Freudiano 
 Mario Carotenuto: producer De Grandis
 Francesca Romana Coluzzi: Miss Politoni 
 Enzo Garinei: Accountant Battistoni 
 Daniela Giordano:  Annie's friend

See also    
 List of Italian films of 1976

References

External links

1976 films
1970s sex comedy films
Films directed by Luigi Cozzi
Films scored by Manuel De Sica
Commedia sexy all'italiana
Films set in Rome
Italian sex comedy films
1976 comedy films
1970s Italian films